The third season of The Real Housewives of Salt Lake City, an American reality television series, is broadcast on Bravo. It  premiered on September 28, 2022, and was primarily filmed in Salt Lake City, Utah. Its executive producers are Lisa Shannon, Dan Peirson, Lori Gordon, Luke Neslage and Andy Cohen.

The Real Housewives of Salt Lake City focuses on the lives of returning cast members Lisa Barlow, Heather Gay, Meredith Marks, Whitney Rose and Jen Shah.

Production and crew
Lisa Shannon, Dan Peirson, Lori Gordon, Luke Neslage and Andy Cohen are recognized as the series' executive producers; it is produced and distributed by Shed Media.

Cast and synopsis
In January 2022, Bravo announced they had fired Jennie Nguyen and ceased filming with her due to Facebook posts criticizing the Black Lives Matter movement. In February 2022, it was announced Mary Cosby had departed the series. 

Barlow, Gay, Marks, Rose, and Shah returned, with new friends-of the housewives Angie Harrington, Angie Katsanevas and Danna Bui-Negrete.

This season marks the current final appearance of Jen Shah, after she was sentenced to 6.5 years in prison. 

 Jen Shah did not attend this reunion due to her legal issues.

Episodes

References

External links
 

 

2022 American television seasons
2023 American television seasons
Salt Lake City (season 3)